Florin Stoian (born 1 October 1979), better known by his stage name Florin  Salam, is a Roma manele singer.

Beginnings 
Salam was born into a family of lăutari. During his adolescence, he sang together with his father and uncle's ensembles.

After his father got too old to sing, Salam took his place, singing with his uncle under the name of Florin Fermecătoru'. Thus, he became a singer highly appreciated by fans of the genre. In the meantime, Salam befriended bandleader Dan Bursuc. He helped Salam to record his first single, called "Ce gagică șmecherită" (English: Such a picky chick), in 2002. He played an important part when the smash hit "Of, viața mea" (English: Oh, my life) was released in 2000, sung by Adrian Minune and Costi Ioniță. At the end of 2002,Salam changed his stage name from "Fermecătorul" (English: charming) to the Arabic "Salam" (English: peace, cf. Hebrew shalom). His first song was a great success, and for this reason he continued to record songs and market them with the help of Dan Bursuc. In this way he released his first album of manele which was surprisingly well received by fans of the genre; the album sold more than 40,000 copies. Likewise, Costi Ioniță recorded one of his albums which enjoyed a high success, the album entitled "Doar cu tine" (English: Only with you). The album was recorded in Constanța where Costi Ioniță has his own recording studio.

His friendship with Dan Bursuc brought only advantages, so he met artists of this genre, artists like Vali Vijelie, Nicolae Guță and Daniela Gyorfi.

In 2008 he performed a song together with pop singer Paula Seling and the Bucharest Symphonic Orchestra. The show host described their performance as a reconciliation between manele and mainstream pop music; in the same respect, the song's lyrics raised the problem of ethnic intolerance.

In October 2011, Salam collaborated with the Bosnian musician Goran Bregović, along with whom he recorded "Hopa Cupa" and "Omule", songs which were included in the album Champagne for Gypsies. The album is "in reaction to the extreme pressure that Gypsies (Roma) have been experiencing lately across Europe".

Salam is the vice-president of Asociația Artiștilor, Muzicanților și Lăutarilor Romi din România (English: The Association of Romani Artists, Musicians and Lăutari from Romania). In December 2005, he was announced as the best manele performer of the year. According to the daily paper Libertatea, politician Mădălin Voicu and footballer Marius Niculae count among his fans.

Saint Tropez and subsequent success 

In February 2013, Salam recorded "Saint Tropez". The song had an unexpected success, with the official video gathering more than 70 million views on YouTube, inasmuch as he was accused that he copied the song from Bulgarian singer Azis. His video became popular and was ranked in most-viewed videos on Romanian YouTube in 2013, after Andra's song, "Inevitabil va fi bine". Since then, Stoian has several concerts in the country and abroad, where large communities of Gypsies live.

Among the most resounding collaborations have included those with Claudia Păun and Nicolae Șușanu, enjoying great success in the country. His smash hit "Ești bombă" (English: You're a bomb), released in July 2013 in collaboration with Șușanu, was viewed by more than 27 million people on YouTube. The songs launched with Claudia ("Ce bine ne stă împreună" – How well we stand together, "Ce frumoasă e dragostea" – How beautiful is love, and "Mergem mai departe" – We go further) feature themes like unfeasible love or desire to be near a loved one, as themes with great appeal to the public.

Today, as Florin Salam, he collaborates with record labels Nek Music and Big Man.

Discography (2012–present)

Personal life 
Salam was married to Ștefania in September 2007, in Antalya, Turkey; the best man was manele singer and close collaborator Adrian Minune. The wedding cost was not less than 500,000 euros. On 12 April 2009, Ștefania (aged 27) died from kidney failure, aggravated by a kidney infection. Moreover, she had long suffered from hepatic cirrhosis.

After his wife's death, Salam had no partner, until 2013, when he met Oana, a young woman from Ploiești. But their relationship did not last more than a few months. As of 2014, he was in a relationship with Roxana Dobre, who had previously posed for Playboy magazine. They intended to marry, and Roxana was pregnant with a girl.

Relations with moneylenders 
Early in his career, Salam was financially supported by brothers Sile and Nuțu Cămătaru, renowned moneylenders. After his wife's death, he succumbed to gambling, with accumulating debts, as a situation that pushed him to borrow money from moneylenders. In August 2013, Stoian was aggressed by three debt collectors in front of the Rin Grand Hotel in Bucharest, who were trying to recover by force money given to Florin with usury. Moreover, Salam was investigated by DIICOT for drug use.

References 

1979 births
Living people
Romanian Romani people
Romanian manele singers
Romani musicians
Lăutari and lăutărească music
Musicians from Bucharest
21st-century Romanian singers